Asbury United Methodist Church is a United Methodist church in the Savannah Victorian Historic District in Savannah, Georgia. The church was founded in 1871 and moved to its current location in 1927.

History 
The church traces its history to the Civil War, when several black Methodists began holding church service without formal affiliation with any established church in the city. In 1871, Reverend Charles O. Fisher of the Methodist Episcopal Church founded the church with 50 members. The church was named after Methodist bishop Francis Asbury. Early in its history, the church used several buildings, including one near Savannah Union Station. In 1927, the church moved to its current location, a church building purchased from Bull Street Baptist Church located on Abercorn Street in the Savannah Victorian Historic District. This building had been constructed in 1887 and partially rebuilt following damage from the 1896 Cedar Keys hurricane. The building incorporates elements of Gothic Revival architecture, including twin towers flanking the front of the building and arched windows. The church is the only African American United Methodist Church in the Victorian Historic District.

In 2019, the church building was placed on the Georgia Trust for Historic Preservation's list of Places in Peril. Water damage has left parts of the building unusable for the congregation. In the preceding years, the congregation had debated finding a new place of worship, but decided instead to raise funds necessary for repairs and improvements.

See also 

 National Register of Historic Places listings in Chatham County, Georgia

References

Bibliography

External links 

 

1871 establishments in Georgia (U.S. state)
African-American churches
Churches in Savannah, Georgia
Historic district contributing properties in Georgia (U.S. state)
Religious organizations established in 1871
United Methodist churches in Georgia (U.S. state)